Rillington is a village and civil parish in the Ryedale district of North Yorkshire, England.

Rillington was mentioned in the Domesday Survey in 1086 and rural life was relatively unchanged until the coming of the railway in 1845

The village has two pubs the Coach and Horses and 
The Fleece, both are located next to St Andrew's Church and the A64.

Transport

A regular Yorkshire Coastliner bus service providing connections to Scarborough, Malton, York and Leeds is operated by Transdev Blazefield.

From 1845 until 1930 the village was served by a railway station which connected Rillington on the York to Scarborough Line. Special trains continued until the 1960s, although the station has now been demolished.

Governance
Rillington was historically part of the East Riding of Yorkshire until 1974. Ryedale District Council is the local authority, with Rillington Parish Council.

An electoral ward in the same name exists. The population of the ward at the 2011 Census was 1,743.

Rillington's Councillor Nathan Garbutt-Moore was elected as Vice-Chairman of Ryedale District Council 2020-22.

Education
The village is served by Rillington Community Primary School. It also falls within the catchment area for Norton College.

Friends of Rillington School is a registered charity that raises funds for the Primary School.

Infamy
It was after this village that Rillington Place in Notting Hill west London was named.

References

External links

Villages in North Yorkshire
Civil parishes in North Yorkshire